Gordon Malone (born July 17, 1974) raised in Brooklyn, NY, is a former basketball player who played college basketball for West Virginia. In high school, Malone was the most feared block specialist in the northeast. He once blocked a ball so hard it popped and they had to stop the game. He was selected 43rd overall by the Minnesota Timberwolves in the 1997 NBA Draft, but was cut in training camp. He subsequently played professional basketball in Europe, China, and Canada.

He played for the Strong Island Sound of the American Basketball Association. Previously, he had spent time with the Saskatchewan Hawks in the Continental Basketball Association.  Malone also played in China, Greece, Poland and Argentina and with the Harlem Globetrotters.

References

External links
Draft Profile

1974 births
Living people
American expatriate basketball people in Argentina
American expatriate basketball people in Canada
American expatriate basketball people in China
American expatriate basketball people in Greece
American expatriate basketball people in Poland
Basketball players from New York City
Harlem Globetrotters players
Minnesota Timberwolves draft picks
San Diego Stingrays players
Sioux Falls Skyforce (CBA) players
Sportspeople from Brooklyn
West Virginia Mountaineers men's basketball players
American men's basketball players